Lee Bradley Brown (18 June 1971 – 12 April 2011) was a British tourist who died in police custody in Dubai, United Arab Emirates. He was arrested by the Dubai Police Force following an altercation with a Nepalese maid at the Burj Al Arab hotel where he was staying. After being placed in solitary confinement, he was found dead in his cell six days after he was arrested. The circumstances surrounding his death remain disputed. In November 2022, a second UK inquest into Brown's death was opened after the Brown family won a challenge at the UK High Court to overturn the original open verdict.

Hotel incident 
Lee Brown was born in East London on 18 June 1971. He was the third of four children to Doris and Vic Brown. After his family moved to Devon, he went to Kingsteignton Secondary School in Newton Abbot. He resided in Ilford, Essex at the time of his death. In April 2011, Brown took a last minute holiday to Dubai in the United Arab Emirates, where he stayed at the Burj Al Arab luxury hotel. According to the hotel staff, a Nepalese housekeeper entered his room unannounced and with no form of uniform or identification. In her statement to police she said she thought the room was empty and needed cleaning. The staff explained that after verbally abusing the maid, an agitated Brown attempted to throw the housekeeper from the internal balcony. Another guest at the hotel reported that Brown shouted for staff to call the police as he had caught her stealing. Hotel security and staff intervened, and they subsequently called an ambulance and then later the police, noting that the Nepalese maid required minor medical attention for her injuries. 

According to Essam Al Humaidan, the Dubai Public Prosecutor, hotel employees said they were met "violent resistance" when they intervened to prevent Brown from throwing the Nepalese maid off the balcony. According to Lieutenant General Dahi Khalfan Tamim, then the Dubai Chief of Police, Brown resisted arrest, banging his head against a wall and trying to throw himself from the hotel's balcony.

Arrest and death
After Brown was arrested he was taken to Bur Dubai police station, officers said he continued to beat on the metal mesh barrier in the patrol car while he was being driven to the police station. However, the statement of the booking officer at Bur Dubai Police Station described Brown as 'calm and in good health'. He was charged with using abusive language and intimidating behaviour and was denied bail.

Shortly after his arrest, Brown was placed in a cell with other European prisoners which included four British men. He was said to have got along well with his cellmates. However, after returning from the prosecutor's office with injuries so severe an ambulance was called, he was moved to solitary confinement. Lieutenant General Tamim initially alleged that Brown's injuries were the result of an altercation with other inmates and said in a statement to the press that he would make CCTV tapes of the incident available as proof that Brown's behaviour warranted such action. This footage was requested on numerous occasions by both the UK Foreign Office and by the UK coroner but it has never been released. In a later statement Tamim retracted what he had previously stated and reported that Brown had caused all his injuries to himself by 'throwing himself to the ground'.

A European prisoner who shared a cell with Brown described Brown's condition as "terrible", but clarified he did not see him being beaten. The prisoner explained, "I saw him bleeding. He had bruises on his face, shoulder and arms when he asked me for help....he kept saying: ‘Please help me, please help me'." The European prisoner noted that "Brown was half naked with both his hands and legs in cuffs. He wore nothing on top … and no shoes… his pants were hanging well below the waist." The prisoner noted that Brown was not eating, and asked the police to help him. Dubai police noted that Brown had been vomiting the day before his death but added that Brown neither complained about nor sought medical help.

The UK Foreign Office confirmed Brown died in custody six days after his arrest, on 12 April 2011.

Investigation and UK Inquest
Allegations that Brown was beaten by police originated from four British citizens who were being held at the same police station on charges unrelated to those of Brown. One of the British prisoners used a mobile phone to contact Brown's sister-in-law, Su, after he found her phone number as the next of kin contact in Brown's passport, which had been left in his cell.  A preliminary post mortem report, based on an examination performed one week after Brown's death, stated "the death... was caused by suffocation as result of outflow of vomiting liquids into his respiratory tract," and noted that hashish was found in Brown's system through analysis of his blood and urine. The report of the Dubai authorities noted that Brown suffered irregular bruising on the left side of the forehead, as well as bruising on the nose and on the inner arm.

An examination of Brown's body by British officials one week later found no evidence that Brown had vomit in his airways. Another post-mortem examination was carried out ahead of the British inquest into his death by consultant pathologist, Dr Benjamin Swift in 2012, at the behest of Brown's family. Dr. Swift concluded that the finding about cannabis was "not relevant" – adding that the drug had not "caused or contributed to his death". However, Dr. Swift also discounted violent trauma as a possible cause of death, describing the bruising as "light".

An official inquest was conducted at Walthamstow Coroner's Court in East London, and this proceeding was attended by Brown's mother, Doris Shafi, his brother, Steven, and his sister-in-law Su Brown. Unusually, no witnesses were called and no other evidence other than the post mortem reports was permitted. No CCTV footage was released by the Dubai authorities, despite references to this footage in UAE press by the Chief of Police and others.

The coroner, Chinyere Inyama, rejected the efforts of barrister John Lofthouse, to draw attention away from the evidence by citing the conflicts between the forensic findings of Emirati and British officials, reminding him that his submissions bore no relevance to the inquest's role, which was limited to a determination of the cause of death. As such, the British coroner returned an open verdict, indicating that there was insufficient evidence to prove either an unlawful nor a natural cause of death, which effectively served to leave doubts about the circumstances of Lee Brown's death.

In 2013 The Independent reported that consultant pathologist, Dr Benjamin Swift, privately hired by Brown's family, had concluded that there was irrefutable evidence that Brown was under the influence of drugs at the time of the incident but that was irrelevant and would not have contributed to his death by asphyxiation on his own vomit. The article stated the finding "lends credibility to mounting claims about brutality towards prisoners in the emirate." However, the article did not mention that Dr. Swift had not ruled out the possibility that Brown sustained his life-threatening injuries while under the influence of the drugs, and even more pointedly, that Dr. Swift explicitly ruled out violent trauma as a possible cause of death. In November 2022, another inquest into the death of Brown (after his family had won the right to challenge the findings of the first one) heard that guards at the Bur Dubai police station had boasted about 'beating the shit out' of Brown. In response the UAE said these claims were based on 'unsubstantiated, third-hand, hearsay claims by former anonymous prison inmates' and the 'allegations were thoroughly investigated in 2011 by both UAE medical authorities and police".

See also
2011 in the United Arab Emirates
Britons in the United Arab Emirates
List of unsolved deaths
United Arab Emirates–United Kingdom relations

References

2010s in Dubai
2011 in the United Arab Emirates
April 2011 events in Asia
Deaths by person in Asia
Tourism in Dubai
Unsolved deaths